Rhopalorhynchus is a genus of sea spiders in the family Colossendeidae.

Species
 Rhopalorhynchus cinculus Bamber, 2001
 Rhopalorhynchus claudes Stock, 1975
 Rhopalorhynchus clavipes Carpenter, 1893
 Rhopalorhynchus filipes Stock, 1991
 Rhopalorhynchus gracillimus Staples, 2009
 Rhopalorhynchus kroeyeri Wood-Mason, 1873
 Rhopalorhynchus lomani  
 Rhopalorhynchus magdalena Stock, 1958
 Rhopalorhynchus mortenseni  
 Rhopalorhynchus pedunculatus  
 Rhopalorhynchus sibogae  
 Rhopalorhynchus tenuissimus

References

Pycnogonids
Chelicerate genera